The Two Tigers (original title: Le due tigri) is the fourth adventure novel in the Sandokan series written by Italian author Emilio Salgari, published in 1904.

Plot summary

India, 1857. Just when Tremal-Naik's life was getting back to normal, the Thugs of the Kali cult return to exact their revenge by kidnapping his daughter Darma. Summoned by Kammamuri, Sandokan and Yanez De Gomera immediately set sail for India to help their loyal friend. But the evil sect knows of their arrival and thwarts them at every turn. Have our heroes finally met their match? It's the Tiger of Malaysia versus the Tiger of India in a fight to the death!

Film versions

There has been one film adaptation of the novel, The Two Tigers filmed in 1941 starring Luigi Pavese as Sandokan, Massimo Girotti as Tremal-Naik, and Sandro Ruffini as Yanez.

Trivia
The action takes place against the backdrop of the Great Mutiny, the Indian Rebellion of 1857.
Many of the events described in the novel actually occurred.

See also

Novels in the Sandokan Series:
The Mystery of the Black Jungle
The Tigers of Mompracem
The Pirates of Malaysia
The King of the Sea
Quest for a Throne

Novels in The Black Corsair series 
The Black Corsair
The Queen of the Caribbean
Son of the Red Corsair

External links
Read the first chapter
Read a Sandokan Biography
Read a review of the Sandokan series at SFSite.com.
Insurgent Sepoys: Europe Views the Revolt of 1857
Italy’s enduring love affair with Emilio Salgari, The Economist, June 2017

1904 Italian novels
Novels by Emilio Salgari
Fiction set in 1857
Books about tigers
Novels set in India
Italian novels adapted into films
20th-century Italian novels
Italian adventure novels